Raymond Rohauer (1924, Buffalo, New York – November 10, 1987) was an American film collector and distributor.

Early life and career
Rohauer moved to California in 1942 and was educated at Los Angeles City College. Rohauer made a five-reel 16mm experimental film Whirlpool (1947) which was not successful. He subsequently became active in film exhibition at the Coronet Theatre from 1950, which was, according to William K. Everson, a "bizarre combination of art house, film society and exploitation cinema". Films shown at the Coronet were generally copied illicitly, occasionally to the irritation of the Museum of Modern Art (MoMA) in New York City because Rohauer often neglected to remove identifying features present in their prints.

in 1954, Rohauer met Buster Keaton and his wife, Eleanor; the couple would develop a business partnership with him to rerelease Keaton's films. The Coronet Theatre art house in Los Angeles, with which Rohauer was involved, was showing The General which "Buster hadn't seen ... in years and he wanted me to see it," Eleanor Keaton said in 1987. "Raymond recognized Buster and their friendship started." Rohauer in that same article recalls, "I was in the projection room. l got a ring that Buster Keaton was in the lobby. I go down and there he is with Eleanor. The next day I met with him at his home. I didn't realize we were going to join forces. But I realized he had this I-don't-care attitude about his stuff. He said, 'It's valueless. I don't own the rights.'" Keaton had prints of the features the Three Ages, Sherlock Jr., Steamboat Bill, Jr., College (missing one reel) and the shorts "The Boat" and "My Wife's Relations", which Keaton and Rohauer had transferred to safety stock from deteriorating nitrate film stock. Other prints of Keaton's films had been found in the home of the actor James Mason who had bought the property from Keaton, and passed them on to Rohauer.

Rohauer was known for claiming rights to films under dubious pretexts; he pursued court battles over The Birth of a Nation, eventually found to be in the public domain, and other classics. He made new prints of producer Leni Riefenstahl's 1938 documentary Olympia, only to find that Riefenstahl was still alive and determined to assert her rights as the true owner. Rohauer and Riefenstahl ultimately agreed on a settlement. Often Rohauer would re-edit films or insert new intertitles, so he could claim copyright on them and charge a licensing fee.

Later career

By the early 1960s Raymond Rohauer was known within the motion picture industry as a leading source for silent films. Television producer Jay Ward licensed Rohauer's silent footage for Ward's satirical Fractured Flickers series.

During the 1960s, Rohauer returned to America's East Coast and became the film curator of the Huntington Hartford Gallery of Modern Art in New York City, although the gallery's existence was relatively brief. In some cases he acquired the rights to stories from the estates of deceased writers, so gaining a hold over The Sheik (1921), produced by Paramount and starring Rudolph Valentino. Alternatively he found instances where living writers no longer held the rights to their work, an example being the J.B. Priestley novel Benighted, which was the basis for The Old Dark House (1932), James Whale's Universal horror film that had been thought lost. According to William K. Everson, he would claim to overseas contacts that he had won libel suits which he had, in fact, lost or accept bookings for silent films which no longer existed.

The biggest market for the "Rohauer Collection," as it came to be merchandised, was for revival theaters and colleges. Rohauer, offering the Buster Keaton silent films and Mack Sennett comedies (which he also claimed to own), distributed deliberately third-rate copies, with the films' visual qualities ruined by harsh contrast and washed-out details. These prints were just legible enough to be shown to audiences, but not good enough to be copied any further.

Rohauer was involved in the preservation of out-takes from the films of Charlie Chaplin which were saved after the filmmaker was forced to leave the United States in 1952. This material formed the basis of the Unknown Chaplin series in 1983. Such was Rohauer's reputation in this field that Kevin Brownlow, the co-producer of this series and the earlier Hollywood (1980), had not previously allowed his production staff to use Rohauer's resources. Brownlow considered him a "pirate", while William K. Everson preferred "freebooter" as it implies the "certain cavalier charm that Rohauer possessed".

Death and legacy
At the time, Rohauer was reported to have died at the St. Luke's–Roosevelt Hospital Center in Manhattan, New York City from complications following a heart attack on November 10, 1987. Later sources say he died from AIDS.

The 700 titles amassed by Rohauer became part of the Cohen Film Collection in 2011. As of 2013, they are in the process of being restored for new screenings and release on DVD.

References

1924 births
1987 deaths
Film distributors (people)
Businesspeople from Buffalo, New York
20th-century American businesspeople